The 21st Vancouver Film Critics Circle Awards honoured the films selected by the Vancouver Film Critics Circle as the best of 2020. Although usually presented in December of the same year for which the awards are presented, these awards were delayed to the winter of 2021, due to the COVID-19 pandemic in Canada and the associated complications in film production and distribution.

Nominations for the Canadian film categories were announced on February 3, 2021, and nominations in the international categories were announced on February 19. The international winners were announced on February 22, and the Canadian winners were announced on March 8.

Winners and nominees

International

Canadian

References

External links
 

2019
2020 film awards
2020 in Canadian cinema
2020 in British Columbia